Frances Annesley (née Lonsdale) (13 January 1907 – 27 March 1994), formally known as Lady Donaldson of Kingsbridge, was a British writer and biographer.

Her father was the playwright Freddie Lonsdale.  In 1935,, she married John George Stuart Donaldson, who became Baron Donaldson of Kingsbridge in 1967. Her body of work included topics such as farming and biographies on writers Evelyn Waugh and P. G. Wodehouse.

During the Second World War she took up farming and made a great success of it, producing record crop and milk yields. She was invited to broadcast in wartime and wrote several books about her experiences.

Works 
 Approach to Farming (1941)
 Four Years Harvest (1945)
 Milk Without Tears (1955)
 Farming in Britain Today (1969) with JGS Donaldson and Derek Barber
 Freddy Lonsdale (1957) — Lady Donaldson's biography of her father, "praised for its balance of candor and affection"
 Child of the Twenties (1962)
 The Marconi Scandal (1962)
 Evelyn Waugh: Portrait of a Country Neighbour (1967) — Not intended as a comprehensive biography, but certainly an interesting perspective on Waugh's life.
 Actor Managers (1970)
 Edward VIII (Weidenfeld & Nicolson, 1974) — Won the Wolfson History Prize in 1974, and was the basis for the seven-part television series Edward & Mrs. Simpson (1978), starring her nephew actor Edward Fox as Edward
 P. G. Wodehouse (1982)
 Yours Plum (1990) Letters of P.G. Wodehouse
 The British Council (1984)
 The Royal Opera House in the 20th Century (1988)
 A Twentieth-Century Life (1992)
Frances Donaldson: A Woman's War (2017) — An edition of her letters, written in 1939 -1945 to her husband Jack. These precede all her published works, and although not originally written for publication, show her literary talent and interesting comment on events.

Portraits of Lady Donaldson 
The United Kingdom's National Portrait Gallery holds two portraits featuring Lady Donaldson as a sitter:
 Exhibit number P528: John George Stuart Donaldson, Baron Donaldson of Kingsbridge and Frances Annesley (née Lonsdale), Lady Donaldson of Kingsbridge by Derry Moore, 12th Earl of Drogheda. Painted in 1992; medium: colour print; measurements: 14 7/8 in. x 12 in. (379 mm x 305 mm).
 Exhibit number x89083: Frances Annesley (née Lonsdale), Lady Donaldson of Kingsbridge by Elliott & Fry.  Medium: vintage print (a photograph).

References

1907 births
1994 deaths
English writers
Donaldson of Kingsbridge
Women biographers
20th-century English women writers
Spouses of life peers